Mycetarotes is a genus of fungus-growing ants in the subfamily Myrmicinae.

Species
 Mycetarotes acutus Mayhé-Nunes, 1995
 Mycetarotes carinatus Mayhé-Nunes, 1995
 Mycetarotes parallelus (Emery, 1906)
 Mycetarotes senticosus Kempf, 1960

References

External links

Formicinae
Ant genera